McIntosh is a census-designated place  in Torrance County, New Mexico, United States. Its population was 1,484 as of the 2010 census. McIntosh has a post office with ZIP code 87032, which opened on August 28, 1906. New Mexico State Road 41 passes through the community.

Demographics

Education
A portion is in the Moriarty-Edgewood School District while the other is in Estancia Municipal Schools.

References

Census-designated places in New Mexico
Census-designated places in Torrance County, New Mexico
Albuquerque metropolitan area